"Forget Me Nots" is a 1982 song co-written and performed by American R&B musician Patrice Rushen. It appears on her seventh album, Straight from the Heart. Making a radical shift in her music, Rushen would continue to harness the particular style of this record all through to her next album Now, released in 1984.

Background
The bassline is particularly recognizable, and was performed on the record by session bass player Freddie Washington. The tenor saxophone solo was played by Los Angeles session player and recording artist Gerald Albright, who also appears in the music video of the song. The lyrics are from the point of view of one professing her longing for a rekindling with an ex-lover. In one part of the music video, the girlfriend of the ex turns her attention to another man. As the singer reunites with the ex, they vacate the premises, leaving the now-ex-girlfriend forlorn. She ruminates on the romance's end and sends the lover forget-me-nots, a flower that since medieval times has been given and worn to symbolize enduring love despite absence or separation.

Critical reception
Brandon Ousley from Albumism wrote in his review of Straight from the Heart, "There's no better evidence of her refined style than on the album's seminal lead single, "Forget Me Nots". Co-written by Rushen, Freddie Washington, and Terri McFaddin, the propulsive dance-funk classic boasts layers of effervescent synthesizers and lively percussion, all anchored by scintillating handclaps, fingersnaps, and Washington's explosive bass work. After the song's irresistible drum-cum-bass break, noted jazz saxophonist Gerald Albright provides a steamy solo that ascends the infectious groove to new heights. A light, airy toned Rushen reminisces on a dissolved relationship between two lovers. With every emotion and desire she explores in her poised phrasing, she longs to rekindle their union by sending her lover 'forget me nots',—a flower that symbolizes enduring love—in hoping that he won't forget the love they once shared."

Chart performance
In the US, "Forget Me Nots" was originally deemed by record label executives as a "flop". 
The single had a respectable chart performance in the United States. The song debuted on the Billboard Hot 100 at No. 90 on May 1, 1982. It peaked at No. 23 on July 3, 1982. the song became a Top 40 pop (#23), Top 5 R&B (#4), and Top 5 dance (#2) hit on the Billboard charts and is the hit for which she is best known.  Rushen had a number of songs on the R&B and Dance charts but "Forget Me Nots" was her only top 40 pop hit in the U.S.  Around the world, the song was also very popular. In Ireland, the single charted on May 16, 1982, and peaked at No. 19. The song debuted on the United Kingdom chart at No. 72 on April 24, 1982, before peaking at No. 8 on May 29. In New Zealand, the song debuted at No. 45 on August 1, 1982, and peaked at No. 8 on September 26, 1982.

Charts

Certifications

Impact and legacy
The single's success culminated in Rushen's scoring her first nomination for Best Female R&B Vocal Performance at the 1983 Grammy Awards. VH1 listed "Forget Me Nots" at number 34 in its list of the 100 Greatest Dance Songs in 2000 and ranked the song number 85 in its list of the 100 Greatest One-Hit Wonders of the 1980s in 2009.

Cover versions and sampling
The song has been covered directly by several artists. 
In 1991, electronic band Tongue 'n' Cheek recorded a dance version of "Forget Me Nots", which reached #26 on the UK Singles Chart. 
In 1995, Eurodance/dance-pop duo  covered it on their debut album Sweet Dreams. It was included on their remix album All Mixed Up. 
In 2006, jazz guitarist Lee Ritenour collaborated with Patrice Rushen and South African singer Zamajobe on a cover version of the song for his album, Smoke 'n Mirrors. Zamajobe sang the lead vocal, with Rushen on background vocals, Rhodes piano, and an organ solo. The version featured a brief African rhythm interlude. In 2007, German dance project Vinylshakerz released their version of "Forget Me Nots".
In 2017, Yung Gravy, a rapper from Minnesota, covered the hit in his song "Forget Me Thots".

The song has been sampled frequently, these include: 
 George Michael in "Fastlove" (1996), which interpolates the song near the end
 It is also sampled by Will Smith's 1997 hit "Men in Black" from the soundtrack to the film of the same name. 
 It also plays at the end of episodes in Men in Black: The Series (ironically, the Neuralyzer, the most famous device from the film and series, is designed to make those affected by it forget things, and the chorus lyrics are modified in "Men in Black" to reflect this). 
 French rapper MC Solaar on "", from his funk-inspired  album
 Hip-hop group The Beatnuts on "Give Me Tha Ass" from the Stone Crazy LP. 
 In addition, Australian satirist Pauline Pantsdown sampled it heavily in the song "Backdoor Man" in 1997.

The song was prominently featured in the 1988 film Big, during the scene where Tom Hanks and Elizabeth Perkins have fun by jumping on a trampoline.

References

External links
 Freddie Washington, biography
 Gerald Albright, biography

1982 singles
Patrice Rushen songs
Songs written by Patrice Rushen
1982 songs
Elektra Records singles
Torch songs